HC Donbass is a professional ice hockey team based in Donetsk, a city in the Donets Basin region of Ukraine. The only Ukrainian club playing outside of the Professional Hockey League (PHL), Donbass plays in Kontinental Hockey League (KHL). Borys Kolesnikov, a prominent Ukrainian politician and businessman, purchased the team in 2010, and since this time the organization has become the most successful in Ukraine.

Donbass played home games at Leader Arena from 2006 to 2010. In 2011, the team permanently moved to the Druzhba Palace of Sports after its renovations were complete.

The club was founded in 2005 as Hockey Club Donetsk-Kolbyko and took part in the XIV Ukrainian Championship by competing in the First League. After 3 years of competing only in tournament play, the club returned to the Ukrainian Hockey Championship. In its 4 seasons of national competition beginning in 2008, the franchise won its first title in 2011, before joining the VHL. It was at this time that the organization founded a subsidiary club, Donbass-2, to compete in the Ukrainian Championship in its place. Donbass-2 won its first title in 2012 during the inaugural PHL season.

Season by season

Ukrainian Championship (2006-2011)

Russian Major League (2011–12)

Tournaments
Note: GP = Games played, W = Wins, OTW = Overtime wins, OTL = Overtime Losses, L = Losses, Pts = Points, GF = Goals for, GA = Goals against

Cup of Ukraine

Westa-Neftek International Cup

Dnipro Cup

Federation Cup

Donbass Open Cup

IIHF Continental Cup

Notes
GP = Games played, W = Wins, OTW = Overtime wins, T = Tie, OTL = Overtime Losses, L = Losses, Pts = Points, GF = Goals for, GA = Goals against
 Ekspres Lviv withdrew from the tournament and did not play due to a loss of sponsorship, forfeiting both matches.
 Vatra Ivano-Frankivst withdrew from the tournament, forfeiting game 3.
 FHU-AST = FHU All Star Team, FHU-POY = FHU Player of the Year

References
General

Specific

HC Donbass
Seasons
HC Donbass